Bojan Banjac (Serbian Cyrillic: Бојан Бaњaц, born 24 October 1971 in Inđija) is a former Serbian association footballer.

After playing with FK Zemun in the First League of FR Yugoslavia, Banjac moved to France in 1996 where he played 23 Ligue 1 games for Lille OSC in 1996-97 season. Banjac had impressed in Zemun's 1996 UEFA Intertoto Cup group stage against Lille's rivals Guingamp, and Jean-Michel Cavalli signed him before the start of the 1996–97 season.

References

External links

 

1971 births
Living people
People from Inđija
Serbian footballers
Serbian expatriate footballers
Expatriate footballers in France
FK Zemun players
Lille OSC players
Ligue 1 players
Ligue 2 players
Association football midfielders